The Kuaiji Mountains ( or Guìjī Shān), formerly romanized as the K'uai-chi Mountains, are a  long mountain range in China's Zhejiang province. They are named for Mount Kuaiji (also Kuàijī Shān in Chinese), the peak just southeast of Shaoxing which is now known as Mount Xianglu.

References

See also
 Mount Xianglu

Mountain ranges of China
Landforms of Zhejiang

de:Kuaiji Shan
fr:Monts Kuaiji
zh:会稽山